The title Lord Hamilton may refer to one of the following:

The Scottish Lordship of Parliament, Lord Hamilton, created for James Hamilton, 1st Lord Hamilton
Duke of Hamilton, the title into which the Lordship of Parliament merged
Arthur Hamilton, Lord Hamilton, retired Lord Justice General
Archie Hamilton, Baron Hamilton of Epsom (born 1941), former British Member of Parliament and minister

Informally, the following titles of nobility, and any holders thereof:
Three subsidiary titles of the Duke of Abercorn—
Marquess of Hamilton
Viscount Hamilton
Baron Hamilton of Strabane
Baron Hamilton of Glenawley (1660)
Baron Hamilton of Stackallen (1715)
Baron Hamilton of Hameldon (1776) 
Baron Hamilton of Wishaw (1831)
Baron Hamilton of Dalzell (1886)

Used incorrectly for courtesy title holders, it can refer to Lord George Hamilton

Hamilton